The 1996 Berlin Marathon was the 23rd running of the annual marathon race held in Berlin, Germany, held on 29 September 1996. Spain's Abel Antón won the men's race in 2:09:15 hours, while the women's race was won by South Africa's Colleen De Reuck in 2:26:35.

Results

Men

Women

References 

 Results. Association of Road Racing Statisticians. Retrieved 2020-04-02.

External links 
 Official website

1996 in Berlin
Berlin Marathon
Berlin Marathon
Berlin Marathon
Berlin Marathon